Notre-Dame-de-Stanbridge is a municipality in the Canadian province of Quebec, located within the Brome-Missisquoi Regional County Municipality. The population as of the Canada 2011 Census was 660.

Demographics

Population
Population trend:

Language
Mother tongue language (2006)

See also
List of municipalities in Quebec

References 

Incorporated places in Brome-Missisquoi Regional County Municipality
Municipalities in Quebec